Quincy Tyler Bernstine (born March 27, 1974) is an American actress and audiobook narrator. In 2019, she won the Obie Award for Sustained Excellence of Performance.

Biography 
Berstine was born on March 27, 1974, in Madison, Wisconsin to Daniel  Bernstine and Nancy Tyler Bernstine, though the couple had divorced. Her father was the head of the International Law School Admission Council and served as the president of Portland State University. Her mother is also a lawyer. Bernstine attended the Georgetown Day School, then received her Bachelor of Arts degree from Brown University and Master of Fine Arts from the University of California, San Diego.

In 2018, Berstine married Rick Hall.

Awards and honors

Audiobook narration

Theatre

Filmography

On stage performances 

 10 out of 12
 The Amateurs 
 As You Like It
 born bad
 Family Week
 Grand Concourse 
 In the Next Room (or The Vibrator Play)
 Marys Seacole 
 Matt & Ben, ‘nami
 The Misanthrope
 Mr. Burns
 The Nether
 Neva
 (I am) Nobody’s Lunch; The Ladies.
 Our Lady of 121st Street 
 Peer Gynt
 Red-Handed Otter
 Ruined
 A Small, Melodramatic Story
 Small Mouth Sounds
 We Are Proud to Present a Presentation…

References 

Actors from Madison, Wisconsin
Brown University alumni
University of California, San Diego alumni
Living people
1974 births
Audiobook narrators